Sathyapriya is an Indian actress. She has acted in over 350 films, and played the heroine in a few of them. She made her debut in Manjal Mugame Varuga opposite Vijayakumar in Tamil. Her notable films include Besuge, Dharmasere, Hosa Jeevana, Roja, Baashha, Chinna Gounder and Solla Marandha Kadhai.

Partial filmography

As actress

Dubbing artist

Television
Serials

Shows

Dramas
 Dharma Jyothi
 Radham Kopam Varatha
 Swamiyar Aava Poore
 Ezhuswarangal

References

External links 
 

Living people
Actresses in Tamil cinema
Actresses in Malayalam cinema
Actresses in Kannada cinema
Indian film actresses
20th-century Indian actresses
21st-century Indian actresses
Indian voice actresses
Actresses in Telugu cinema
Indian television actresses
Actresses in Tamil television
Actresses in Malayalam television
1958 births
Actresses in Hindi cinema